A coin set, or mint set, is a collection of Uncirculated or Proof coins, released by a mint. Such sets are usually released annually and often called a year set. They include sets of all the circulating coins of that year, as well as sets of commemorative coins.

The Royal Mint, Royal Australian Mint, Royal Canadian Mint, United States Mint and others mints all release sets of proof and uncirculated coins each year.

Sometimes the coins for annual sets are struck in a special way. For example, the Danmarks Nationalbank issues a coin set each year with coins that are "much more clearly embossed than the ordinary coins in circulation."

Early coin sets were issued in paper of cardboard folders which often led to toning, due to the sulphur content of the card.

See also
 Coins distributed as sets, organized by countries
 United States Mint coin sets

References

Coins